The Kujawy mine – the largest Polish limestone surface mine located in Bielawy, in northern Poland in Kuyavian-Pomeranian Voivodeship, owned by Lafarge company.

See also 
 List of mines in Poland

References 

Mines in Poland